Ward 22 Scarborough—Agincourt is a municipal ward in the Scarborough section of Toronto, Ontario, Canada. It's represented on Toronto City Council by Nick Mantas. It covers the area of the City of Toronto bounded by  Steeles Avenue East to the north, Highway 401 to the south, Victoria Park Avenue to the west, and Midland Avenue to the east. It contains the neighbourhoods of L'Amoreaux, Tam O'Shanter and part of Agincourt.

The ward was created for the 2018 municipal elections when newly elected Premier of Ontario Doug Ford introduced legislation to require that Toronto's municipal elections use the same ridings as it does for provincial and federal elections.

From 2000 to 2018, Scarborough—Agincourt was represented on city council by Wards 39 (northern half) and 40 (southern half). From 1998 to 2000 Scarborough—Agincourt was represented on city council by Ward 17, and returned two members. From 1988 to 1997 Scarborough—Agincourt was represented on Metropolitan Toronto Council until Scarborough's amalgamation into the city.

Election results

2022

2021 by-election
A by-election was held on January 15, 2021 to replace Jim Karygiannis who was removed from city council after losing an appeal to the Supreme Court of Canada due to exceeding spending limits in the 2018 election.

In addition to in-person voting, this was the first municipal election in Toronto to offer a mail-in ballot. The ballot was the same as provided during in-person voting. In addition to sending the ballot by mail, residents were able to deliver it to one of two drop boxes or the city's elections warehouse.

Candidates
Rocco Achampong: Lawyer. Ran for Mayor of Toronto in 2010; he finished 6 of 40 candidates, losing to Rob Ford, who he had endorsed. Noted for challenging Premier Doug Ford's reduction of Toronto city council's size in 2018, in the Superior Court of Ontario. He had declared as a candidate, before the decision.
Sharif Ahmed
Rigaud Bastien
David Chenh
Kevin Clarke: A "perennial candidate" since 1994. Most recently, he stood for appointment in 2018, when council looked to fill the Ward 41, Scarborough Rouge River seat, and in the 2020 Toronto Centre federal by-election.
Jimmy Dagher
Corey David: Socialist Action party candidate.
Itohan Evbagharu: Member of the "City Youth Council Of Toronto". When Ward 41, Scarborough—Rouge River was made vacant in 2018, applied to be appointed as councillor. In the 2018 municipal election, she ran for election in Ward 24, Scarborough—Guildwood. Did not allow the City to make contact information publicly available.
Lily Fang
Jonathan Fon
Kevin Haynes: Haynes' alleged, with evidence, that during the 2018 campaign, a lobbyist firm paid for people to canvass for candidates. The campaigns themselves did not pay, a loophole in the Municipal Elections Act, flag as far back as 2009. Haines previously released audio of incumbent councillor Jim Karygiannis saying that his supporters' bylaw infractions should be ignored.
Anthony Internicola: Municipal candidate in Ward 40, Scarborough—Agincourt in 2014, finishing 3rd of 3 candidates, and in Ward 23 Scarborough North in 2018, finishing 11th of 11 candidates. |People's Party of Canada candidate for Scarborough-Agincourt in the 2019 Canadian federal election.
Renee Jagdeo: Urban planning student. Media coverage has focused on the fact that she would be the youngest councillor ever, if elected.
Michael Julihen: Connects the COVID-19 pandemic to "ungodly living: repent." Not a resident of the ward. In 2018, he tried to be appointed as the councillor for Ward 33, Don Valley East, and later in the year campaigned for a council seat in Etobicoke—Lakeshore.
Walayat Khan: Did not allow the City to make contact information publicly available, has no website for their platform, and no media coverage.
Serge Khatchadourian: Small business owner.
Ronald Lin: Translator, paralegal, business owner. In the 2018 municipal election, Lin received the most votes of a non-incumbent, finishing in third place.
Christina Liu: Entrepreneur. Endorsed by Progressive Conservative MPPs Vijay Thanigasalam, Vincent Ke, Mike Parsa, Logan Kanapathi and Billy Pang and Conservative  MP Bob Saroya.
Tony Luk: Local entrepreneur who founded an immigration and translation services consultancy in 1989, in Scarborough-Agincourt. 30+ year resident in the Ward with heavy community involvement. Endorsed by York Regional councillor Joe Li, former Liberal MPPs Tony Ruprecht and Reza Moridi
Paul Maguire
Nick Mantas: Former chief of staff to Karygiannis. Endorsed by Progressive Conservative MPP Aris Babikian, former Liberal MPP Marie Bountrogianni and Conservative Senator Salma Ataullahjan.
Varun Sriskanda - Masters in Law graduate from Osgoode Hall Law School and former constituency assistant to Sandra Pupatello
Daniel Trayes - Finished last of 6 candidates in Ward 30, Toronto—Danforth, in the 2014 municipal election.
Jeff Vitale
Colin Williams
Manna Wong: The school trustee for Scarborough—Agincourt 2014. Endorsed by the Elementary Teachers of Toronto, describing her as "a strong, principled leader who will be a progressive voice at City Hall."
Yong Wu

Results

2018

2014

Ward 39

Ward 40

2010

Ward 39

Ward 40

2006

Ward 39

Ward 40

2003

Ward 39

Ward 40

2000

Ward 39

Ward 40

1997
Two to be elected

1994

1991

1988

References

Toronto city council wards
Scarborough, Toronto
2018 establishments in Ontario